Babibasiliscus is an extinct genus of casquehead lizard (family Corytophanidae) that lived in what is now Wyoming during the early Eocene, approximately 48 million years ago. The genus is known from a single species, Babibasiliscus alxi, which was named by paleontologist Jack Conrad in 2015 on the basis of a fossilized skull from the Bridger Formation in the Green River Basin. The name Babibasiliscus comes from the Shoshoni word babi, meaning "older male cousin", and Basiliscus, a modern-day genus of casquehead lizards. The specimen is undeformed and nearly complete except for the tip of the snout and the top of the skull, making it unclear whether the distinctive bony crest of living corytophanids was present in prehistoric relatives like Babibasiliscus. Bones on the right side of lower jaw of the specimen are thickened and fused together, suggesting that the jaw had broken and healed when the animal was alive.

Babibasiliscus occurs farther north than any living genus of corytophanid. During the Eocene temperatures in what is now Wyoming were about  warmer than they are today, and the region was likely covered by a tropical forest based on other Eocene fossil assemblages known from western North America.

Phylogenetic analysis indicates that Babibasiliscus is deeply nested within Corytophanidae as the sister taxon of the living genus Laemanctus. Below is a cladogram from Conrad's description of Babibasiliscus showing its relationships to other corytophanids:

References 

Corytophanidae
Eocene lepidosaurs
Fossil taxa described in 2015
Eocene reptiles of North America
Paleontology in Wyoming